Gazgazareh-ye Olya (also Romanized as Gazgazāreh-ye ‘Olyā; also known as Gar Gezāreh-ye ‘Olyā, Gazgazār-e Bālā, Gaz Gazar-e Bālā, Gazgazāreh Bāla, and Gaz Gezāreh-ye Bālā) is a village in Sis Rural District, Bolbanabad District, Dehgolan County, Kurdistan Province, Iran. At the 2006 census, its population was 308, in 76 families. The village is populated by Kurds.

References 

Towns and villages in Dehgolan County
Kurdish settlements in Kurdistan Province